Dohesaran (also Romanized as Doheşārān and Doḩeşārān; also known as Deh Sarūn and Sarun) is a village in Ayask Rural District, in the Central District of Sarayan County, South Khorasan Province, Iran. At the 2006 census, its population was 872, in 241 families.

References 

Populated places in Sarayan County